Vanessa May-Anne Uri , also known as Halina Perez (December 11, 1981 – March 4, 2004), was a Filipino actress.

Life and career
Perez was born Vanessa May-Anne Uri. When she was four, her father was imprisoned twice which led to her parents' separation. Her father reportedly burnt their house when he was on drugs. She graduated from the Sta. Maria Academy School in Santa Maria, Laguna. Perez appeared in erotic thrillers and comedies. Notable credits include Kiskisan (2003), Kasiping (along with Diana Zubiri) (2002), Balat Sibuyas (2002), Amorseko: Damong Ligaw (2001) and Ikapitong Gloria (2001).

Death
On March 4, 2004, Perez attended the opening of a Konica photo store in Legazpi City. On their way back to Manila their van collided with a truck head-on at the boundary of Tagkawayan, Quezon and Camarines Norte. Perez' manager Isah Munio died at the scene. The van driver died after having surgery as well. Perez broke her neck in the crash but was still breathing when rescuers pulled her out of the wreck. She was dead by the time she arrived at the hospital. The remaining four victims survived. Perez was buried at the Santa Maria Catholic Cemetery in her town in Santa Maria, Laguna.

Filmography

Movies

References

1981 births
2004 deaths
Filipino film actresses
Road incident deaths in the Philippines
20th-century Filipino actresses
21st-century Filipino actresses